Joseph Travis Johnson (February 28, 1858 – May 8, 1919) was a United States representative from South Carolina and a United States district judge of the United States District Court for the Western District of South Carolina.

Education and career

Born on February 28, 1858, in Brewerton, an unincorporated community in Laurens County, South Carolina, Johnson attended the common schools, then received an Artium Baccalaureus degree in 1879 from Erskine College and a Bachelor of Laws in 1883 from Vanderbilt University Law School. Prior to entering the bar, he taught school for several years. He was admitted to the bar and entered private practice in Laurens, South Carolina from 1883 to 1895. He continued in private practice in Spartanburg, South Carolina from 1895 to 1915.

Congressional service

Johnson was elected as a Democrat to the United States House of Representatives of the 57th United States Congress and to the seven succeeding Congresses and served from March 4, 1901, until April 19, 1915, when he resigned to accept a federal judgeship.

Federal judicial service

Johnson received a recess appointment from President Woodrow Wilson on March 9, 1915, to the United States District Court for the Western District of South Carolina, to a new seat authorized by 38 Stat. 961. He was nominated to the same position by President Wilson on January 4, 1916. He was confirmed by the United States Senate on January 24, 1916, and received his commission the same day. His service terminated on May 8, 1919, due to his death in Spartanburg. He was interred in Oakwood Cemetery in Spartanburg.

References

Sources

 

1858 births
1919 deaths
Judges of the United States District Court for the Western District of South Carolina
United States district court judges appointed by Woodrow Wilson
20th-century American judges
Erskine College alumni
Democratic Party members of the United States House of Representatives from South Carolina
19th-century American politicians
People from Laurens County, South Carolina
People from Spartanburg, South Carolina
19th-century American judges